Sunrise Radio is a 24-hour commercial radio station, focusing on entertainment, music and news from the Indian subcontinent. It broadcasts to the Greater London area on 963/972 AM, on DAB (SDL National), and via the internet.

History
Sunrise Radio started life as the pirate radio station Sina Radio, originally founded by Manjit Singh Gehdu and based in Southall, Middlesex from 1984 until 1988.

In 1989, owned by Avtar Lit, it would be awarded a license and officially launched on 5 November 1989 becoming the first 24-hour radio station specifically for the Asian demographic. It initially broadcast to West London on 1413 AM. In 1994 it took over the BBC's former 1458 kHz frequency which had been used for GLR.

In 1992, the station acquired Sunrise House in Southall which was officially opened on 21 January 1993 by Peter Baldwin Chief Executive of the Radio Authority. In 2016 Sunrise Radio Moved to new purpose built Studio and office in Hounslow, this is also the company's Headquarters.

The station expanded by also broadcasting on satellite television, first on the Astra analogue satellite, and later on Sky Digital.

From 1991 through until August 2004, the Sunrise Radio satellite feed was the source of the live hourly IRN news bulletins for numerous UK commercial, community and hospital radio stations.

In July 2013, Lit was one of forty radio professionals honoured by the Radio Centre for their significant contribution to the growth and success of the industry.

On 13 January 2014, the station would go into administration. The station was bought by the mobile operator Lyca, and was able to retain its license, with a move to 963/972 AM. Tony Lit was appointed managing director, with Gurdev Jassi as chairman.

In November 2014, the Sunrise Radio Training Academy was launched - a free training scheme for those wanting to pursue a career in radio. The scheme allows those wishing to pursue a career in radio to train alongside professionals and learn every aspect of the business, from producing to presenting and radio journalism.

Sunrise Radio went Nationwide on DAB in early 2016.

On 5 November 2019 Sunrise Radio completed 30 years on air.

Events
Sunrise Radio has organised and sponsored many events and melas, including a collaboration with the London Mayor's office to put together the London Mela, launched in August 2003 in Gunnersbury Park, West London. The event attracted an audience of over 60,000.

In 2004 Sunrise Radio launched the Asian Lifestyle Show at London's Olympia attracting over 40,000 people. The event was widely recognised as the largest celebration of Asian culture in Europe. The show was shortlisted for the 'Best New Consumer Show 2004' by the Association of Event Organisers. The Asian Lifestyle Show 2004-2007 was consistently sold out.

Sunrise Radio has collaborated with University College London (UCL) and Imperial College to support their West End production, Rangeela.

Recognition
 Farah Ahmed ( Bollywood Top 20) named the Best Media Personality by the Pakistani Achievement Awards 2014
 Andy Gill nominated for Best Show (Breakfast Show Monday-Friday) – Asian Media Awards 2014
 Sunrise Radio nominated for Radio Station of the Year – Asian Media Awards 2014
 Sunrise Radio wins the NTL Commercial Radio Award for Marketing Excellence 2004
Sunrise Radio one of five shortlisted for the Media Week Awards – Media Brand of the Year 2004 - alongside Century FM, XFM, Living TV & The Independent
Asian Media Awards Radio Station of the Year 2016 & 2017
Sunrise Radio scooped 'The AMA's Radio Station of the Year 2019'  at the awards ceremony held in Manchester at the Hilton Manchester Deansgate in October 2019. This is the third time in four years the radio station has won this title and this year's win comes in the same day as the release of Rajar Q3 2019  which confirmed Sunrise Radio as the UK's NO1 commercial Asian radio station, a title which the radio station has retain consecutively over its 30 years of broadcasting to the UK's Asian community
Sunrise Radio wins the coveted Asian Radio Station of the Year 2020 at the British Asian Media Awards.
Sunrise Radio scooped 'The AMA's Radio Station of the Year 2021'  for the fourth time at the ninth annual Asian Media Awards.

References

External links
Official Website

Sunrise
Radio stations established in 1989
Asian mass media in the United Kingdom
British Indian mass media
Former pirate radio stations
Pirate radio stations in the United Kingdom